São Paulo (Portuguese for 'Saint Paul') is the most populous city in Brazil, and is the capital of the state of São Paulo, the most populous and wealthiest Brazilian state, located in the country's Southeast Region. Listed by the GaWC as an alpha global city, São Paulo is the most populous city proper in the Americas, the Western Hemisphere and the Southern Hemisphere, as well as the world's 4th largest city proper by population. Additionally, São Paulo is the largest Portuguese-speaking city in the world. It exerts strong international influences in commerce, finance, arts and entertainment. The city's name honors the Apostle, Saint Paul of Tarsus. The city's metropolitan area, the Greater São Paulo, ranks as the most populous in Brazil and the 12th most populous on Earth. The process of conurbation between the metropolitan areas around the Greater São Paulo (Campinas, Santos, Jundiaí, Sorocaba and São José dos Campos) created the São Paulo Macrometropolis, a megalopolis with more than 30 million inhabitants, one of the most populous urban agglomerations in the world.

Having the largest economy by GDP in Latin America, the city is home to the São Paulo Stock Exchange. Paulista Avenue is the economic core of São Paulo. The city has the 23rd largest GDP in the world, representing alone 10.7% of all Brazilian GDP and 36% of the production of goods and services in the state of São Paulo, being home to 63% of established multinationals in Brazil, and was responsible for 28% of the national scientific production in 2005, as measured by the number of science papers published in journals.

The metropolis is also home to several of the tallest skyscrapers in Brazil, including the Mirante do Vale, Edifício Itália, Banespa, North Tower and many others. The city has cultural, economic and political influence nationally and internationally. It is home to monuments, parks and museums such as the Latin American Memorial, the Ibirapuera Park, Museum of Ipiranga, São Paulo Museum of Art, and the Museum of the Portuguese Language. The city holds events like the São Paulo Jazz Festival, São Paulo Art Biennial, the Brazilian Grand Prix, São Paulo Fashion Week, the ATP Brasil Open, the Brasil Game Show and the Comic Con Experience. São Paulo's LGBT Pride parade ranks second only to the New York City Pride March as the largest LGBTQ pride parade in the world.

São Paulo is a cosmopolitan, melting pot city, home to the largest Arab, Italian, Japanese, and Portuguese diasporas, with examples including ethnic neighborhoods of Bixiga, Bom Retiro, and Liberdade. In 2016, inhabitants of the city were native to over 200 countries. People from the city are known as paulistanos, while paulistas designates anyone from the state, including the paulistanos. The city's Latin motto, which it has shared with the battleship and the aircraft carrier named after it, is Non ducor, duco, which translates as "I am not led, I lead." The city, which is also colloquially known as Sampa, Selva de Pedra (Jungle of Stone) or Terra da Garoa (Land of Drizzle), is known for its unreliable weather, the size of its helicopter fleet, its architecture, gastronomy, severe traffic congestion and skyscrapers. São Paulo was one of the host cities of the 1950 and the 2014 FIFA World Cup. Additionally, the city hosted the IV Pan American Games, Miss Universe 2011, and the São Paulo Indy 300.

History

Pre-colonial period

The region of modern-day São Paulo, then known as Piratininga plains around the Tietê River, was inhabited by the Tupi people, such as the Tupiniquim, Guaianás, and Guarani. Other tribes also lived in areas that today form the metropolitan region.

The region was divided in Caciquedoms (chiefdoms) at the time of encounter with the Europeans. The most notable cacique was Tibiriçá, known for his support for the Portuguese and other European colonists. Among the many indigenous names of places, rivers, neighborhoods, etc., that survive today are Tietê, Ipiranga, Tamanduateí, Anhangabaú, Piratininga, Itaquaquecetuba, Cotia, Itapevi, Barueri, Embu-Guaçu, etc.

Colonial period

The Portuguese village of São Paulo dos Campos de Piratininga was marked by the founding of the Colégio de São Paulo de Piratininga on 25 January 1554. The Jesuit college of twelve priests included Manuel da Nóbrega and Spanish priest José de Anchieta. They built a mission on top of a steep hill between the Anhangabaú and Tamanduateí rivers.

They first had a small structure built of rammed earth, made by Native Indian workers in their traditional style. The priests wanted to evangelize these Indians who lived in the Plateau region of Piratininga and convert them to Christianity. The site was separated from the coast by the Serra do Mar mountain range, called "Serra Paranapiacaba” by the Indians.

The college was named for a Christian saint and its founding on the feast day of the celebration of the conversion of the Apostle Paul of Tarsus. Father José de Anchieta wrote this account in a letter to the Society of Jesus:

For the next two centuries, São Paulo developed as a poor and isolated village that survived largely through the cultivation of subsistence crops by the labor of natives. For a long time, São Paulo was the only village in Brazil's interior, as travel was too difficult for many to reach the area. Mem de Sá forbade colonists to use the Caminho do Piraiquê (Piraiquê Path) and today known as Piaçaguera, because of frequent Indian raids along it.

On 22 March 1681, Luís Álvares de Castro, the Second Marquis de Cascais and donee of the Captaincy of São Vicente, moved the capital to the village of São Paulo (see Timeline of São Paulo), designating it the "Head of the captaincy". The new capital was established on 23 April 1683, with public celebrations.

The Bandeirantes

In the 17th century, São Paulo was one of the poorest regions of the Portuguese colony. It was also the center of interior colonial development. Because they were extremely poor, the Paulistas could not afford to buy African slaves, as did other Portuguese colonists. The discovery of gold in the region of Minas Gerais, in the 1690s, brought attention and new settlers to São Paulo. The Captaincy of São Paulo and Minas de Ouro (see Captaincies of Brazil) was created on 3 November 1709, when the Portuguese crown purchased the Captaincies of São Paulo and Santo Amaro from the former grantees.

Conveniently located in the country, up the steep Serra do Mar escarpment/mountain range when traveling from Santos, while also not too far from the coastline, São Paulo became a safe place to stay for tired travelers. The town became a center for the bandeirantes, intrepid invaders who marched into unknown lands in search for gold, diamonds, precious stones, and Indians to enslave. The bandeirantes, which could be translated as "flag-bearers" or "flag-followers", organized excursions into the land with the primary purpose of profit and the expansion of territory for the Portuguese crown. Trade grew from the local markets and from providing food and accommodation for explorers. The bandeirantes eventually became politically powerful as a group, and forced the expulsion of the Jesuits from the city of São Paulo in 1640. The two groups had frequently come into conflict because of the Jesuits' opposition to the domestic slave trade in Indians.

On 11 July 1711, the town of São Paulo was elevated to city status. Around the 1720s, gold was found by the pioneers in the regions near what are now Cuiabá and Goiânia. The Portuguese expanded their Brazilian territory beyond the Tordesillas Line to incorporate the gold regions. When the gold ran out in the late 18th century, São Paulo shifted to growing sugar cane. Cultivation of this commodity crop spread through the interior of the Captaincy. The sugar was exported through the Port of Santos. At that time, the first modern highway between São Paulo and the coast was constructed and named the Calçada do Lorena ("Lorena’s settway"). Nowadays, the estate that is home to the Governor of the State of São Paulo, in the city of São Paulo, is called the Palácio dos Bandeirantes (Bandeirantes Palace), in the neighborhood of Morumbi.

Imperial Period

After Brazil became independent from Portugal in 1822, as declared by Emperor Pedro I where the Monument to the Independence of Brazil is located, he named São Paulo as an Imperial City. In 1827, a law school was founded at the Convent of São Francisco, today part of the University of São Paulo. The influx of students and teachers gave a new impetus to the city's growth, thanks to which the city became the Imperial City and Borough of Students of St. Paul of Piratininga.

The expansion of coffee production was a major factor in the growth of São Paulo, as it became the region's chief export crop and yielded good revenue. It was cultivated initially in the Paraíba Valley region in the East of the State of São Paulo, and later on in the regions of Campinas, Rio Claro, São Carlos and Ribeirão Preto.

From 1869 onward, São Paulo was connected to the port of Santos by the Estrada de Ferro Santos-Jundiaí (Santos-Jundiaí Railroad), nicknamed The Lady. In the late 19th century, several other railroads connected the interior to the state capital. São Paulo became the point of convergence of all railroads from the interior of the state. Coffee was the economic engine for major economic and population growth in the State of São Paulo.

In 1888, the "Golden Law" (Lei Áurea) was sanctioned by Isabel, Princess Imperial of Brazil, 
abolishing the institution of slavery in Brazil. Slaves were the main source of labor in the coffee plantations until then. As a consequence of this law, and following governmental stimulus towards the increase of immigration, the province began to receive a large number of immigrants, largely Italians, Japanese and Portuguese peasants, many of whom settled in the capital. The region's first industries also began to emerge, providing jobs to the newcomers, especially those who had to learn Portuguese.

Old Republican Period

By the time Brazil became a republic on 15 November 1889, coffee exports were still an important part of São Paulo's economy. São Paulo grew strong in the national political scene, taking turns with the also rich state of Minas Gerais in electing Brazilian presidents, an alliance that became known as "coffee and milk", given that Minas Gerais was famous for its dairy production. During this period, São Paulo went from regional center to national metropolis, becoming industrialized and reaching its first million inhabitants in 1928. Its greatest growth in this period was relative in the 1890s when it doubled its population. The height of the coffee period is represented by the construction of the second Luz Station (the present building) at the end of the 19th century and by the Paulista Avenue in 1900, where they built many mansions.

Industrialization was the economic cycle that followed the coffee plantation model. By the hands of some industrious families, including many immigrants of Italian and Jewish origin, factories began to arise and São Paulo became known for its smoky, foggy air. The cultural scene followed modernist and naturalist tendencies in fashion at the beginning of the 20th century. Some examples of notable modernist artists are poets Mário de Andrade and Oswald de Andrade, artists Anita Malfatti, Tarsila do Amaral and Lasar Segall, and sculptor Victor Brecheret. The Modern Art Week of 1922 that took place at the Theatro Municipal was an event marked by avant-garde ideas and works of art. In 1929, São Paulo won its first skyscraper, the Martinelli Building. The modifications made in the city by Antônio da Silva Prado, Baron of Duprat and Washington Luís, who governed from 1899 to 1919, contributed to the climate development of the city; some scholars consider that the entire city was demolished and rebuilt at that time. São Paulo's main economic activities derive from the services industry – factories are since long gone, and in came financial services institutions, law firms, consulting firms. Old factory buildings and warehouses still dot the landscape in neighborhoods such as Barra Funda and Brás. Some cities around São Paulo, such as Diadema, São Bernardo do Campo, Santo André, and Cubatão are still heavily industrialized to the present day, with factories producing from cosmetics to chemicals to automobiles.

Constitutionalist Revolution of 1932

This revolution is considered by some historians as the last armed conflict to take place in Brazil's history. On 9 July 1932, the population of São Paulo town rose against a coup d'état by Getúlio Vargas to take the presidential office. The movement grew out of local resentment from the fact that Vargas ruled by decree, unbound by a constitution, in a provisional government. The 1930 coup also affected São Paulo by eroding the autonomy that states enjoyed during the term of the 1891 Constitution and preventing the inauguration of the governor of São Paulo Júlio Prestes in the Presidency of the Republic, while simultaneously overthrowing President Washington Luís, who was governor of São Paulo from 1920 to 1924. These events marked the end of the Old Republic.

The uprising commenced on 9 July 1932, after four protesting students were killed by federal government troops on 23 May 1932. On the wake of their deaths, a movement called MMDC (from the initials of the names of each of the four students killed, Martins, Miragaia, Dráusio and Camargo) started. A fifth victim, Alvarenga, was also shot that night, but died months later. In a few months, the state of São Paulo rebelled against the federal government. Counting on the solidarity of the political elites of two other powerful states, (Minas Gerais and Rio Grande do Sul), the politicians from São Paulo expected a quick war. However, that solidarity was never translated into actual support, and the São Paulo revolt was militarily crushed on 2 October 1932. In total, there were 87 days of fighting (9 July to 4 October 1932 – with the last two days after the surrender of São Paulo), with a balance of 934 official deaths, though non-official estimates report up to 2,200 dead, and many cities in the state of São Paulo suffered damage due to fighting. There is an obelisk in front of Ibirapuera Park that serves as a memorial to the young men that died for the MMDC. The University of São Paulo's Law School also pays homage to the students that died during this period with plaques hung on its arcades.

Geography

São Paulo is the capital of the most populous state in Brazil, São Paulo, located at latitude 23°33'01'' south and longitude 46°38'02'' west. Of the entire area of the municipality,  are urban areas (2015), being the largest urban area in the country.

The distance is covered by two highways, the Anchieta and the Imigrantes, (see "Transportation" below) that roll down the range, leading to the port city of Santos and the beach resort of Guarujá. Rolling terrain prevails within the urbanized areas of São Paulo except in its northern area, where the Serra da Cantareira Range reaches a higher elevation and a sizable remnant of the Atlantic Rain Forest. The region is seismically stable and no significant activity has ever been recorded.

Hydrography 

The Tietê River and its tributary, the Pinheiros River, were once important sources of fresh water and leisure for São Paulo. However, heavy industrial effluents and wastewater discharges in the later 20th century caused the rivers to become heavily polluted. A substantial clean-up program for both rivers is underway. Neither river is navigable in the stretch that flows through the city, although water transportation becomes increasingly important on the Tietê river further downstream (near river Paraná), as the river is part of the River Plate basin.

No large natural lakes exist in the region, but the Billings and Guarapiranga reservoirs in the city's southern outskirts are used for power generation, water storage and leisure activities, such as sailing. The original flora consisted mainly of broadleaf evergreens. Non-native species are common, as the mild climate and abundant rainfall permit a multitude of tropical, subtropical and temperate plants to be cultivated, especially the ubiquitous eucalyptus. The north of the municipality contains part of the  Cantareira State Park, created in 1962, which protects a large part of the metropolitan São Paulo water supply. In 2015, São Paulo experienced a major drought, which led several cities in the state to start a rationing system.

Parks and biodiversity 

São Paulo is located in an ecotone area between 3 biomes: mixed ombrophilous forest, dense ombrophilous forest and cerrado; the latter had some plant species native to the pampas in the city. There were several species typical of both biomes, among them we can mention: araucarias, pitangueiras, cambucís, ipês, jabuticabeiras, queen palms, muricís-do-campo, etc. 

About 21% of the municipality's area is covered by green areas, including ecological reserves (2010 data).

In the municipality it is possible to observe forest birds that usually appear in the spring, due to the belt of native forest that still surrounds the metropolitan region. Species such as the rufous-bellied thrush, golden-chevroned tanager, great kiskadee and hummingbird are the most common. Despite the intense pollution, the main rivers of the city, the Tietê and the Pinheiros, shelter several species of animals such as capybaras, hawks, southern lapwings, herons and nutrias. Other species found in the municipality are the gray brocket, howler monkey, green-billed toucan and the Amazonian umbrellabird.

Environmental issues 

Air pollution in the city is intense, mainly due to the huge number of cars that circulate daily on its streets, avenues and highways. The World Health Organization (WHO) sets a limit of 20 micrograms of particulate matter per cubic meter of air as a safe annual average. In an assessment carried out by the WHO among over a thousand cities around the world in 2011, the city of São Paulo was ranked 268th among the most polluted, with an average rate of 38 micrograms per cubic meter, a rate well above the limit imposed by the organization, but lower than in other Brazilian cities, such as Rio de Janeiro (64 micrograms per cubic meter). A 2013 study found that air pollution in the city causes more deaths than traffic accidents.

In addition to atmospheric pollution, the municipality has serious problems due to water pollution, mainly concentrated in its two main rivers, the Tietê River and the Pinheiros River, which are highly degraded and are some of the most polluted rivers in the country. However, both go through the process of depollution, with the Tietê Project having been created in 1992 and having already cost 2.7 billion dollars. In 2019, the Novo Rio Pinheiros Project was created, under the administration of João Doria, whose aim is to reduce sewage discharged into tributaries, improve water quality and revitalize the banks by 2022.

The problem of balanced water supply for the city - and for the metropolis, in general - is also a worrying issue: São Paulo has few sources of water in its own perimeter, having to seek it in distant hydrographic basins. The problem of water pollution is also aggravated by the irregular occupation of watershed areas, caused by urban expansion, driven by the difficulty of access to land and housing in central areas by the low-income population and associated with real estate speculation and precariousness in new subdivisions. With this, there is also an overvaluation of individual transport over public transport – leading to the current rate of more than one vehicle for every two inhabitants and aggravating the problem of environmental pollution.

Climate

According to the Köppen classification, the city has a humid subtropical climate (Cfa/Cwa). The Tropic of Capricorn, at about 23°27' S, passes through north of São Paulo and roughly marks the boundary between the tropical and temperate areas of South America. Because of its elevation, however, São Paulo experiences a more temperate climate. The city experiences four seasons. The summer is warm and rainy. Autumn and spring are transitional seasons. Winter is the coldest season, with cloudiness around town and frequently polar air masses. Frosts occur sporadically in regions further away from the center, in some winters throughout the city.

Rainfall is abundant, annually averaging . It is especially common in the warmer months averaging  and decreases in winter, averaging . Neither São Paulo nor the nearby coast has ever been hit by a tropical cyclone and tornadic activity is uncommon. During late winter, especially August, the city experiences the phenomenon known as "veranico" or "verãozinho" ("little summer"), which consists of hot and dry weather, sometimes reaching temperatures well above . On the other hand, relatively cool days during summer are fairly common when persistent winds blow from the ocean. Secondary to deforestation, groundwater pollution, and climate change, São Paulo is increasingly susceptible to drought and water shortages.

Demographics

São Paulo's population has grown rapidly. By 1960 it had surpassed that of Rio de Janeiro, making it Brazil's most populous city. By this time, the urbanized area of São Paulo had extended beyond the boundaries of the municipality proper into neighboring municipalities, making it a metropolitan area with a population of 4.6 million. Population growth has continued since 1960, although the rate of growth has slowed.

In 2013, São Paulo was the most populous city in Brazil and in South America. According to the 2010 IBGE Census, there were 11,244,369 people residing in the city of São Paulo. Portuguese remains the most widely spoken language and São Paulo is the largest city in the Portuguese speaking world. 
 
In 2010, the city had 2,146,077 opposite-sex couples and 7,532 same-sex couples. The population of São Paulo was 52.6% female and 47.4% male. The census found 6,824,668 White people (60.6%), 3,433,218 Pardo (multiracial) people (30.5%), 736,083 Black people (6.5%), 246,244 Asian people (2.2%) and 21,318 Amerindian people (0.2%).

Immigration and migration

São Paulo is considered the most multicultural city in Brazil. From 1870 to 2010, approximately 2.3 million immigrants arrived in the state, from all parts of the world. The Italian community is one of the strongest, with a presence throughout the city. Of the 9 million inhabitants of São Paulo, 50% (4.5 million people) have full or partial Italian ancestry. São Paulo has more descendants of Italians than any Italian city (the largest city of Italy is Rome, with 2.8 million inhabitants).

The main groups, considering all the metropolitan area, are: 6 million people of Italian descent, 3 million people of Portuguese descent, 1.7 million people of African descent, 1 million people of Arab descent, 665,000 people of Japanese descent, 400,000 people of German descent, 250,000 people of French descent, 150,000 people of Greek descent, 120,000 people of Chinese descent, 120,000–300,000 Bolivian immigrants, 50,000 people of Korean descent, and 80,000 Jews.

Even today, Italians are grouped in neighborhoods like Bixiga, Brás, and Mooca to promote celebrations and festivals. In the early twentieth century, Italian and its dialects were spoken almost as much as Portuguese in the city, which influenced the formation of the São Paulo dialect of today. Six thousand pizzerias are producing about a million pizzas a day. Brazil has the largest Italian population outside Italy, with São Paulo being the most populous city with Italian ancestry in the world.

The Portuguese community is also large; it is estimated that three million paulistanos have some origin in Portugal. The Jewish colony is more than 80,000 people in São Paulo and is concentrated mainly in Higienópolis and Bom Retiro.

From the nineteenth century through the first half of the twentieth century, São Paulo also received German immigrants (in the current neighborhood of Santo Amaro), Spanish and Lithuanian (in the neighborhood Vila Zelina).

Until 1920, 1,078,437 Italians entered in the State of São Paulo. Of the immigrants who arrived there between 1887 and 1902, 63.5% came from Italy. Between 1888 and 1919, 44.7% of the immigrants were Italians, 19.2% were Spaniards and 15.4% were Portuguese. In 1920, nearly 80% of São Paulo city's population was composed of immigrants and their descendants and Italians made up over half of its male population. At that time, the Governor of São Paulo said that "if the owner of each house in São Paulo display the flag of the country of origin on the roof, from above São Paulo would look like an Italian city". In 1900, a columnist who was absent from São Paulo for 20 years wrote "then São Paulo used to be a genuine Paulista city, today it is an Italian city."

São Paulo also is home of the largest Japanese community outside Japan. In 1958 the census counted 120,000 Japanese in the city and by 1987, there were 326,000 with another 170,000 in the surrounding areas within São Paulo state. As of 2007, the Paulistano Japanese population outnumbered their fellow diaspora in the entirety of Peru, and in all individual American cities.

Research conducted by the University of São Paulo (USP) shows the city's high ethnic diversity: when asked if they are "descendants of foreign immigrants", 81% of the students reported "yes". The main reported ancestries were: Italian (30.5%), Portuguese (23%), Spanish (14%), Japanese (8%), German (6%), Brazilian (4%), African (3%), Arab (2%) and Jewish (1%).

The city once attracted numerous immigrants from all over Brazil and even from foreign countries, due to a strong economy and for being the hub of most Brazilian companies. São Paulo is also receiving waves of immigration from Haiti and from many countries of Africa and the Caribbean. Those immigrants are mainly concentrated in Praça da Sé, Glicério and Vale do Anhangabaú in the Central Zone of São Paulo.

Since the 19th century people began migrating from northeastern Brazil into São Paulo. This migration grew enormously in the 1930s and remained huge in the next decades. The concentration of land, modernization in rural areas, changes in work relationships and cycles of droughts stimulated migration. Northeastern migrants live mainly in hazardous and unhealthy areas of the city, in cortiços ("guettos"), in favelas ("slums") of the metropolis, because they offer cheaper housing. The largest concentration of northeastern migrants was found in the area of Sé/Brás (districts of Brás, Bom Retiro, Cambuci, Pari and Sé). In this area they composed 41% of the population.

Metropolitan area

The nonspecific term "Grande São Paulo" ("Greater São Paulo") covers multiple definitions. The legally defined Região Metropolitana de São Paulo consists of 39 municipalities in total and a population of 21.1 million inhabitants.

The Metropolitan Region of São Paulo is known as the financial, economic, and cultural center of Brazil. Among the largest municipalities, Guarulhos, with a population of more than 1 million people is the biggest one. Several others count more than 100,000 inhabitants, such as São Bernardo do Campo (811,000 inh.) and Santo André (707,000 inh.) in the ABC Region. The ABC Region, comprising Santo André, São Bernardo do Campo and São Caetano do Sul in the south of Grande São Paulo, is an important location for industrial corporations, such as Volkswagen and Ford Motors.

Because São Paulo has urban sprawl, it uses a different definition for its metropolitan area alternately called the Expanded Metropolitan Complex of São Paulo and the São Paulo Macrometropolis. Analogous to the BosWash definition, it is one of the largest urban agglomerations in the world, with 32 million inhabitants, behind Tokyo, which includes 4 contiguous legally defined metropolitan regions and 3 micro-regions.

Religion

Like the cultural variety verifiable in São Paulo, there are several religious manifestations present in the city. Although it has developed on an eminently Catholic social matrix, both due to colonization and immigration – and even today most of the people of São Paulo declare themselves Roman Catholic – it is possible to find in the city dozens of different Protestant denominations, as well as the practice of Islam, Spiritism, among others. Buddhism and Eastern religions also have relevance among the beliefs most practiced by Paulistanos. It is estimated that there are more than one hundred thousand Buddhist followers and Hindu. Also considerable are Judaism, Mormonism and Afro-Brazilian religions.

According to data from the Brazilian Institute of Geography and Statistics (IBGE), in 2010 the population of São Paulo was 6,549,775 Roman Catholics (58.2%), 2,887,810 Protestants (22.1%), 531,822 Spiritists (4.7 percent), 101,493 Jehovah's Witnesses (0.9 percent), 75,075 Buddhists (0.7 percent), 50,794 Umbandists (0.5 percent), 43,610 Jews (0.4 percent), 28,673 Catholic Apostolic Brazilians (0.3%), 25,583 eastern religious (0.2%), 18,058 Candomblecists (0.2%), 17,321 Mormons (0.2%), 14,894 Eastern Orthodox (0.1%), 9,119 spiritualists (0.1%), 8,277 Muslims (0.1%), 7,139 esoteric (0.1%), 1,829 practiced Indian traditions (<0.1%) and 1,008 were Hindu (<0.1%). Others 1,056 008 had no religion (9.4%), 149,628 followed other Christian religiosities (1.3%), 55,978 had an undetermined religion or multiple belonging (0.5%), 14,127 did not know (0.1%) And 1,896 reported following other religiosities (<0.1%).

The Catholic Church divides the territory of the municipality of São Paulo into four ecclesiastical circumscriptions: the Archdiocese of São Paulo, and the adjacent Diocese of Santo Amaro, the Diocese of São Miguel Paulista and the Diocese of Campo Limpo, the last three suffragans of the first. The archive of the archdiocese, called the Metropolitan Archival Dom Duarte Leopoldo e Silva, in the Ipiranga neighborhood, holds one of the most important documentary heritage in Brazil. The archiepiscopal is the Metropolitan Cathedral of São Paulo (known as Sé Cathedral), in Praça da Sé, considered one of the five largest Gothic temples in the world. The Catholic Church recognizes as patron saints of the city Saint Paul of Tarsus and Our Lady of Penha of France.

The city has the most diverse Protestant or Reformed creeds, such as the Evangelical Community of Our Land, Maranatha Christian Church, Lutheran Church, Presbyterian Church, Methodist Church, Anglican Episcopal Church, Baptist churches, Assembly Church of God, The Seventh-day Adventist Church, the World Church of God's Power, the Universal Church of the Kingdom of God, the Christian Congregation in Brazil, among others, as well as Christians of various denominations.

Source: IBGE 2010.

Public security

According to the 2011 Global Homicide Survey released by the United Nations, in the period between 2004 and 2009 the homicide rate dropped from 20.8 to 10.8 murders per 100,000 inhabitants. The UN pointed to São Paulo as an example of how big cities can reduce crime. Crime rates, such as homicide, have been steadily declining for 8 years. The number of murders in 2007 was 63% lower than in 1999. Carandiru's 9th DP is considered one of the five best police stations in the world and the best in Latin America.

In 2008, the city of São Paulo ranked 493rd in the list of the most violent cities in Brazil. Among the capitals, it was the fourth least violent, registering, in 2006, homicide rates higher than those of Boa Vista, Palmas and Natal.

In a survey on the Adolescent Homicide Index (IHA), released in 2009, São Paulo ranked 151st among 267 cities with more than 100,000 inhabitants. In November 2009, the Ministry of Justice and the Brazilian Forum of Public Security published a survey that pointed to São Paulo as the safest Brazilian capital for young people. Between 2000 and 2010, the city of São Paulo reduced its homicide rate by 78%. According to data from the Map of Violence 2011, published by the Sangari Institute and the Ministry of Justice, the city of São Paulo has the lowest homicide rate per 100,000 inhabitants among all Brazilian capitals.

Social challenges

Since the beginning of the 20th century, São Paulo has been a major economic center in Latin America. During two World Wars and the Great Depression, coffee exports (from other regions of the state) were critically affected. This led wealthy coffee farmers to invest in industrial activities that turned São Paulo into Brazil's largest industrial hub.
 Crime rates consistently decreased in the 21st century. The citywide homicide rate was 6.56 in 2019, less than a fourth of the 27.38 national rate.
 Air quality has steadily increased during the modern era.
 The two major rivers crossing the city, Tietê and Pinheiros, are highly polluted. A major project to clean up these rivers is underway.
 The Clean City Law or antibillboard, approved in 2007, focused on two main targets: anti-publicity and anti-commerce. Advertisers estimate that they removed 15,000 billboards and that more than 1,600 signs and 1,300 towering metal panels were dismantled by authorities.
 São Paulo metropolitan region, adopted vehicle restrictions from 1996 to 1998 to reduce air pollution during wintertime. Since 1997, a similar project was implemented throughout the year in the central area of São Paulo to improve traffic.
 There were more than 30,000 homeless people in 2021 according to official data. It increased by 31% in two years, and doubled in 20 years.

Languages

The primary language is Portuguese. The general language from São Paulo General, or Tupi Austral (Southern Tupi), was the Tupi-based trade language of what is now São Vicente, São Paulo, and the upper Tietê River. In the 17th century it was widely spoken in São Paulo and spread to neighboring regions while in Brazil. From 1750 on, following orders from Marquess of Pombal, Portuguese language was introduced through immigration and consequently taught to children in schools. The original Tupi Austral language subsequently lost ground to Portuguese, and eventually became extinct. Due to the large influx of Japanese, German, Spanish, Italian and Arab immigrants etc., the Portuguese idiom spoken in the metropolitan area of São Paulo reflects influences from those languages.

The Italian influence in São Paulo accents is evident in the Italian neighborhoods such as Bela Vista, Mooca, Brás and Lapa. Italian mingled with Portuguese and as an old influence, was assimilated or disappeared into spoken language. The local accent with Italian influences became notorious through the songs of Adoniran Barbosa, a Brazilian samba singer born to Italian parents who used to sing using the local accent.

Other languages spoken in the city are mainly among the Asian community: São Paulo is home to the largest Japanese population outside Japan. Although today most Japanese-Brazilians speak only Portuguese, some of them are still fluent in Japanese. Some people of Chinese and Korean descent are still able to speak their ancestral languages. In some areas it is still possible to find descendants of immigrants who speak German (especially in the area of Brooklin paulista) and Russian or East European languages (especially in the area of Vila Zelina). In the west zone of São Paulo, specially at Vila Anastácio and Lapa region, there is a Hungarian colony, with three churches (Calvinist, Baptist and Catholic), so on Sundays it is possible to see Hungarians talking to each other on sidewalks.

Sexual diversity

The Greater São Paulo is home to a prominent self-identifying gay, bisexual and transgender community, with 9.6% of the male population and 7% of the female population declaring themselves to be non-heterosexual. Same-sex civil unions have been legal in the whole country since 5 May 2011, while same-sex marriage in São Paulo was legalized on 18 December 2012. Since 1997, the city has hosted the annual São Paulo Gay Pride Parade, considered the biggest pride parade in the world by the Guinness Book of World Records with over 5 million participants, and typically rivalling the New York City Pride March for the record.

Strongly supported by the State and the City of São Paulo government authorities, in 2010, the city hall of São Paulo invested R$1 million reais in the parade and provided a solid security plan, with approximately 2,000 policemen, two mobile police stations for immediate reporting of occurrences, 30 equipped ambulances, 55 nurses, 46 medical physicians, three hospital camps with 80 beds. The parade, considered the city's second largest event after the Formula One, begins at the São Paulo Museum of Art, crosses Paulista Avenue, and follows Consolação Street to Praça Roosevelt in Downtown São Paulo. According to the LGBT app Grindr, the gay parade of the city was elected the best in the world.

Education

São Paulo has public and private primary and secondary schools and vocational-technical schools. More than nine-tenths of the population are literate and roughly the same proportion of those age 7 to 14 are enrolled in school. There are 578 universities in the state of São Paulo.

The city of São Paulo is also home to research and development facilities and attracts companies due to the presence of regionally renowned universities. Science, technology and innovation is leveraged by the allocation of funds from the state government, mainly carried out by means of the Foundation to Research Support in the State of São Paulo (Fundação de Amparo à Pesquisa do Estado de São Paulo – FAPESP), one of the main agencies promoting scientific and technological research.

Health care

São Paulo is one of the largest health care hubs in Latin America. Among its hospitals are the Albert Einstein Israelites Hospital, ranked the best hospital in all Latin America and the Hospital das Clínicas, the largest in the region, with a total area of 600,000 square meters and offers 2,400 beds, distributed among its eight specialized institutes and two assisting hospitals.

The main hospitals in the city of São Paulo concentrate in the upper-income areas, the majority of the population of the city has a private health insurance. This can includes hospitals, private practices and pharmacies. The city of São Paulo has the largest number of foreigners comparing with any other Brazilian city and an intense health tourism. In Brazil, the city of São Paulo has the largest number of doctors who can speak more than one language, which in this case is Portuguese, with the secondary languages predominantly are English and Spanish.

The private health care sector is very large and most of Brazil's best hospitals are in the city. As of September 2009, the city of São Paulo had: 32,553 ambulatory clinics, centers and professional offices (physicians, dentists and others); 217 hospitals, with 32,554 beds; 137,745 health care professionals, including 28,316 physicians.

The municipal government operates public health facilities across the city's territory, with 770 primary health care units (UBS), ambulatory and emergency clinics and 17 hospitals. The Municipal Secretary of Health has 59,000 employees, including 8,000 physicians and 12,000 nurses. 6,000,000 citizens uses the facilities, which provide drugs at no cost and manage an extensive family health program (PSF – Programa de Saúde da Família).

The Sistema Integrado de Gestão de Assistência à Saúde de São Paulo – SIGA Saúde (Integrated Health Care Management System in São Paulo) has been operating in the city of São Paulo since 2004. Today there are more than 22 million registered users, including the people of the Greater São Paulo, with a monthly average of 1.3 million appointments.

Government

As the capital of the state of São Paulo, the city is home to the Bandeirantes Palace (state government) and the Legislative Assembly. The Executive Branch of the municipality of São Paulo is represented by the mayor and his cabinet of secretaries, following the model proposed by the Federal Constitution. The organic law of the municipality and the Master Plan of the city, however, determine that the public administration must guarantee to the population effective tools of manifestation of participatory democracy, which causes that the city is divided in regional prefectures, each one led by a Regional Mayor appointed by the Mayor.

The legislative power is represented by the Municipal Chamber, composed of 55 aldermen elected to four-year posts (in compliance with the provisions of Article 29 of the Constitution, which dictates a minimum number of 42 and a maximum of 55 for municipalities with more than five million inhabitants). It is up to the house to draft and vote fundamental laws for the administration and the Executive, especially the municipal budget (known as the Law of Budgetary Guidelines). In addition to the legislative process and the work of the secretariats, there are also a number of municipal councils, each dealing with different topics, composed of representatives of the various sectors of organized civil society. The actual performance and representativeness of such councils, however, are sometimes questioned.

The following municipal councils are active: Municipal Council for Children and Adolescents (CMDCA); of Informatics (WCC); of the Physically Disabled (CMDP); of Education (CME); of Housing (CMH); of Environment (CADES); of Health (CMS); of Tourism (COMTUR); of Human Rights (CMDH); of Culture (CMC); and of Social Assistance (COMAS) and Drugs and Alcohol (COMUDA). The Prefecture also owns (or is the majority partner in their social capital) a series of companies responsible for various aspects of public services and the economy of São Paulo:
 São Paulo Turismo S/A (SPTuris): company responsible for organizing large events and promoting the city's tourism.
 Companhia de Engenharia de Tráfego (CET): subordinated to the Municipal Transportation Department, is responsible for traffic supervision, fines (in cooperation with DETRAN) and maintenance of the city's road system.
 Companhia Metropolitana de Habitação de São Paulo (COHAB): subordinate to the Department of Housing, is responsible for the implementation of public housing policies, especially the construction of housing developments.
 Empresa Municipal de Urbanização de São Paulo (EMURB): subordinate to the Planning Department, is responsible for urban works and for the maintenance of public spaces and urban furniture.
 Companhia de Processamento de Dados de São Paulo (PRODAM): responsible for the electronic infrastructure and information technology of the city hall.
 São Paulo Transportes Sociedade Anônima (SPTrans): responsible for the operation of the public transport systems managed by the city hall, such as the municipal bus lines.

Subdivisions
São Paulo is divided into 32 subprefectures, each with an administration ("subprefeitura") divided into several districts ("distritos"). The city also has a radial division into nine zones for purpose of traffic control and bus lines, which don't fit into the administrative divisions. These zones are identified by colors in the street signs. The historical core of São Paulo, which includes the inner city and the area of Paulista Avenue, is in the Subprefecture of Sé. Most other economic and tourist facilities of the city are inside an area officially called Centro Expandido (Portuguese for "Broad Center", or "Broad Downtown"), which includes Sé and several other subprefectures, and areas immediately around it.

International relations 

São Paulo is twinned with:

 Abidjan, Ivory Coast
 Asunción, Paraguay
 Barcelona, Spain
 Belmonte, Portugal

 Cluj-Napoca, Romania
 Havana, Cuba
 İzmir, Turkey
 Lima, Peru

 Macau, China
 Miami-Dade County, United States
 Milan, Italy

 Osaka, Japan
 La Paz, Bolivia

 San Cristóbal de La Laguna, Spain
 Santiago, Chile
 Santiago de Compostela, Spain
 Seoul, South Korea
 Shanghai, China
 Yerevan, Armenia

Economy

São Paulo is considered the "financial capital of Brazil", as it is the location for the headquarters of major corporations and of banks and financial institutions. São Paulo is Brazil's highest GDP city and the 10th largest in the world, using Purchasing power parity.

According to data from the IBGE, its gross domestic product (GDP) in 2010 was R$450 billion, approximately
 billion, 12.26% of Brazilian GDP and 36% of all production of goods and services of the State of São Paulo.

According to PricewaterhouseCoopers average annual economic growth of the city is 4.2%. São Paulo also has a large "informal" economy. In 2005, the city of São Paulo collected R$90 billion in taxes and the city budget was R$15 billion. The city has 1,500 bank branches and 70 shopping malls.

, São Paulo is the third largest exporting municipality in Brazil after Parauapebas, PA and Rio de Janeiro, RJ. In that year São Paulo's exported goods totaled $7.32B (USD) or 3.02% of Brazil's total exports. The top five commodities exported by São Paulo are soybean (21%), raw sugar (19%), coffee (6.5%), sulfate chemical wood pulp (5.6%), and corn (4.4%).

The São Paulo Stock Exchange (BM&F Bovespa) is Brazil's official stock and bond exchange. It is the largest stock exchange in Latin America, trading about R$6 billion (US$3.5 billion) every day.

São Paulo's economy is going through a deep transformation. Once a city with a strong industrial character, São Paulo's economy has followed the global trend of shifting to the tertiary sector of the economy, focusing on services. The city is unique among Brazilian cities for its large number of foreign corporations.

63% of all the international companies with business in Brazil have their head offices in São Paulo. São Paulo has one of the largest concentrations of German businesses worldwide and is the largest Swedish industrial hub alongside Gothenburg.

São Paulo ranked second after New York in FDi magazine's bi-annual ranking of Cities of the Future 2013–14 in the Americas, and was named the Latin American City of the Future 2013–14, overtaking Santiago de Chile, the first city in the previous ranking. Santiago now ranks second, followed by Rio de Janeiro.

The per capita income for the city was R$32,493 in 2008. According to Mercer's 2011 city rankings of cost of living for expatriate employees, São Paulo is now among the ten most expensive cities in the world, ranking 10th in 2011, up from 21st in 2010 and ahead of London, Paris, Milan and New York City.

Luxury brands tend to concentrate their business in São Paulo. Because of the lack of department stores and multi-brand boutiques, shopping malls as well as the Jardins district attract most of the world's luxurious brands. Most of the international luxury brands can be found in the Iguatemi, Cidade Jardim or JK shopping malls or on the streets of Oscar Freire, Lorena or Haddock Lobo in the Jardins district. They are home of brands such as Cartier, Chanel, Dior, Giorgio Armani, Gucci, Louis Vuitton, Marc Jacobs, Tiffany & Co. Cidade Jardim was opened in São Paulo in 2008, it is a  mall, landscaped with trees and greenery scenario, with a focus on Brazilian brands but also home to international luxury brands such as Hermès, Jimmy Choo, Pucci and Carolina Herrera. Opened in 2012, JK shopping mall has brought to Brazil brands that were not present in the country before such as Goyard, Tory Burch, Llc., Prada, and Miu Miu.

The Iguatemi Faria Lima, in Faria Lima Avenue, is Brazil's oldest mall, opened in 1966. The Jardins neighborhood is regarded among the most sophisticated places in town, with upscale restaurants and hotels. The New York Times once compared Oscar Freire Street to Rodeo Drive. In Jardins there are luxury car dealers. One of the world's best restaurants as elected by The World's 50 Best Restaurants Award, D.O.M., is there.

Tourism 

Large hotel chains whose target audience is the corporate traveler are in the city. São Paulo is home to 75% of the country's leading business fairs. The city also promotes one of the most important fashion weeks in the world, São Paulo Fashion Week, established in 1996 under the name Morumbi Fashion Brasil, is the largest and most important fashion event in Latin America. Besides, the São Paulo Gay Pride Parade, held since 1997 on Paulista Avenue is the event that attracts more tourists to the city.

The annual March For Jesus is a large gathering of Christians from Protestant churches throughout Brazil, with São Paulo police reporting participation in the range of 350,000 in 2015. In addition, São Paulo hosts the annual São Paulo Pancake Cook-Off in which chefs from across Brazil and the world participate in competitions based on the cooking of pancakes.

Cultural tourism also has relevance to the city, especially when considering the international events in the metropolis, such as the São Paulo Art Biennial, that attracted almost 1 million people in 2004.

The city has a nightlife that is considered one of the best in the country, and is an international hub of highly active and diverse nightlife with bars, dance bars and nightclubs staying open well past midnight. There are cinemas, theaters, museums, and cultural centers. The Rua Oscar Freire was named one of the eight most luxurious streets in the world, according to the Mystery Shopping International, and São Paulo the 25th "most expensive city" of the planet.

According to the International Congress & Convention Association, São Paulo ranks first among the cities that host international events in Americas and the 12th in the world, after Vienna, Paris, Barcelona, Singapore, Berlin, Budapest, Amsterdam, Stockholm, Seoul, Lisbon, and Copenhagen. According to a study by MasterCard in 130 cities around the world, São Paulo was the third most visited destination in Latin America (behind Mexico City and Buenos Aires) with 2.4 million foreign travelers, who spent US$2.9 billion in 2013 (the highest among the cities in the region). In 2014, CNN ranked nightlife São Paulo as the fourth best in the world, behind New York City, Berlin and Ibiza, in Spain.

The cuisine of the region is a tourist attraction. The city has 62 cuisines across 12,000 restaurants. During the 10th International Congress of Gastronomy, Hospitality and Tourism (Cihat) conducted in 1997, the city received the title of "World Gastronomy Capital" from a commission formed by 43 nations' representatives.

Urban infrastructure

Since the beginning of the 20th century, São Paulo has been one of the main economic centers of Latin America. With the First and Second World Wars and the Great Depression, coffee exports to the United States and Europe were heavily affected, forcing the rich coffee growers to invest in the industrial activities that would make São Paulo the largest industrial center in Brazil. The new job vacancies contributed to attract a significant number of immigrants (mainly from Italy) and migrants, especially from the Northeastern states. From a population of only 32.000 people in 1880, São Paulo now has 8.5 million inhabitants in 1980. The rapid population growth has brought many problems for the city.

São Paulo is practically all served by the water supply network. The city consumes an average of 221 liters of water/inhabitant/day while the UN recommends the consumption of 110 liters/day. The water loss is 30.8%. However, between 11 and 12.8% of households do not have a sewage system, depositing waste in pits and ditches. Sixty percent of the sewage collected is treated. According to data from IBGE and Eletropaulo, the electricity grid serves almost 100% of households. The fixed telephony network is still precarious, with coverage of 67.2%. Household garbage collection covers all regions of the municipality but is still insufficient, reaching around 94% of the demand in districts such as Parelheiros and Perus. About 80% of the garbage produced daily by Paulistas is exported to other cities, such as Caieiras and Guarulhos. Recycling accounts for about 1% of the 15,000 metric tons of waste produced daily.

Urban planning

São Paulo has a myriad of urban fabrics. The original nuclei of the city are vertical, characterized by the presence of commercial buildings and services; And the peripheries are generally developed with two to four-story buildings – although such generalization certainly meets with exceptions in the fabric of the metropolis. Compared to other global cities (such as the island cities of New York City and Hong Kong), however, São Paulo is considered a "low-rise building" city. Its tallest buildings rarely reach forty stories, and the average residential building is twenty. Nevertheless, it is the fourth city in the world in quantity of buildings, according to the page specialized in research of data on buildings Emporis Buildings, besides possessing what was considered until 2014 the tallest skyscraper of the country, the Mirante do Vale, also known as Palácio Zarzur Kogan, with 170 meters of height and 51 floors.

Such tissue heterogeneity, however, is not as predictable as the generic model can make us imagine. Some central regions of the city began to concentrate indigents, drug trafficking, street vending and prostitution, which encouraged the creation of new socio-economic centralities. The characterization of each region of the city also underwent several changes throughout the 20th century. With the relocation of industries to other cities or states, several areas that once housed factory sheds have become commercial or even residential areas.

São Paulo has a history of actions, projects and plans related to urban planning that can be traced to the governments of Antonio da Silva Prado, Baron Duprat, Washington and Luis Francisco Prestes Maia. However, in general, the city was formed during the 20th century, growing from village to metropolis through a series of informal processes and irregular urban sprawl.

Urban growth in São Paulo has followed three patterns since the beginning of the 20th century, according to urban historians: since the late 19th Century and until the 1940s, São Paulo was a condensed city in which different social groups lived in a small urban zone separated by type of housing; from the 1940s to the 1980s, São Paulo followed a model of center-periphery social segregation, in which the upper and middle-classes occupied central and modern areas while the poor moved towards precarious, self-built housing in the periphery; and from the 1980s onward, new transformations have brought the social classes closer together in spatial terms, but separated by walls and security technologies that seek to isolate the richer classes in the name of security. Thus, São Paulo differs considerably from other Brazilian cities such as Belo Horizonte and Goiânia, whose initial expansion followed determinations by a plan, or a city like Brasília, whose master plan had been fully developed prior to construction.

The effectiveness of these plans has been seen by some planners and historians as questionable. Some of these scholars argue that such plans were produced exclusively for the benefit of the wealthier strata of the population while the working classes would be relegated to the traditional informal processes. In São Paulo until the mid-1950s, the plans were based on the idea of "demolish and rebuild", including former Mayor Francisco Prestes Maia's road plan for São Paulo (known as the Avenues Plan) or Saturnino de Brito's plan for the Tietê River. The Plan of the Avenues was implemented during the 1920s and sought to build large avenues connecting the city center with the outskirts. This plan included renewing the commercial city center, leading to real estate speculation and gentrification of several downtown neighborhoods. The plan also led to the expansion of bus services, which would soon replace the trolley as the preliminary transportation system. This contributed to the outwards expansion of São Paulo and the peripherization of poorer residents. Peripheral neighborhoods were usually unregulated and consisted mainly of self-built single-family houses.

In 1968 the Urban Development Plan proposed the Basic Plan for Integrated Development of São Paulo, under the administration of Figueiredo Ferraz. The main result was zoning laws. It lasted until 2004 when the Basic Plan was replaced by the current Master Plan. That zoning, adopted in 1972, designated "Z1" areas (residential areas designed for elites) and "Z3" (a "mixed zone" lacking clear definitions about their characteristics). Zoning encouraged the growth of suburbs with minimal control and major speculation. After the 1970s peripheral lot regulation increased and infrastructure in the periphery improved, driving land prices up. The poorest and the newcomers now could not purchase their lot and build their house, and were forced to look for a housing alternative. As a result, favelas and precarious tenements (cortiços) appeared. These housing types were often closer to the city's center: favelas could sprawl in any unused terrain (often dangerous or unsanitary) and decaying or abandoned buildings for tenements were abundant inside the city. Favelas went back into the urban perimeter, occupying the small lots not yet occupied by urbanization – alongside polluted rivers, railways, or between bridges. By 1993, 19.8% of São Paulo's population lived in favelas, compared to 5.2% in 1980. Today, it is estimated that 2.1 million Paulistas live in favelas, which represents about 11% of the metropolitan area's population.

Transport

Roads

Automobiles are the main means to get into the city. In March 2011, more than 7 million vehicles were registered. Heavy traffic is common on the city's main avenues and traffic jams are relatively common on its highways.

The city is crossed by 10 major motorways: President Dutra Highwa/BR-116 (connects São Paulo to the east and north-east of the country); Régis Bittencourt Highway/BR-116 (connects São Paulo to the south of the country); Fernão Dias Highway/BR-381 (connects São Paulo to the north of the country); Anchieta Highwa/SP-150 (connects São Paulo to the ocean coast); Immigrants Highway/SP-150 (connects São Paulo to the ocean coast); President Castelo Branco Highway/SP-280 (connects São Paulo to the west and north-west of the country); Raposo Tavares Highway/SP-270 (connects São Paulo to the west of the country); Anhanguera Highway/SP-330 (connects São Paulo to the north-west of the country, including its capital city); Bandeirantes Highway/SP-348 (connects São Paulo to the north-west of the country); Ayrton Senna Highway/SP-70 (named after Brazilian legendary Formula One driver Ayrton Senna, the motorway connects São Paulo to east locations of the state, as well as the north coast of the state).

The Rodoanel Mário Covas (official designation SP-021) is the beltway of the Greater São Paulo. It was named after Mário Covas, who was mayor of the city of São Paulo (1983–1985) and a state governor (1994-1998/1998-2001) until his death from cancer. It is a controlled access highway with a speed limit of  under normal weather and traffic circumstances. The west, south and east parts are completed, and the north part, which will close the beltway, is due in 2022 and is being built by DERSA.

Airports

São Paulo has two main airports, São Paulo/Guarulhos International Airport for international flights and national hub, and São Paulo–Congonhas Airport for domestic and regional flights. Another airport, the Campo de Marte Airport, serves private jets and light aircraft. The three airports together moved more than 58.000.000 passengers in 2015, making São Paulo one of the top 15 busiest in the world, by number of air passenger movements. The region of Greater São Paulo is also served by Viracopos International Airport, São José dos Campos Airport and Jundiaí Airport.

Congonhas Airport operates flights mainly to Rio de Janeiro, Porto Alegre, Belo Horizonte and Brasília. Built in the 1930s, it was designed to handle the increasing demand for flights, in the fastest growing city in the world. Located in Campo Belo District, Congonhas Airport is close to the three main city's financial districts: Paulista Avenue, Brigadeiro Faria Lima Avenue and Engenheiro Luís Carlos Berrini Avenue.

Every day nearly 110.000 people pass through the airport, which connects Brazil to 36 countries around the world. 370 companies operate there, generating more than 53.000 jobs. The international airport is connected to the metropolitan rail system, with Line 13 (CPTM).

Campo de Marte is in Santana district, the northern zone of São Paulo. The airport handles private flights and air shuttles, including air taxi firms. Opened in 1935, Campo de Marte is the base for the largest helicopter fleet in Brazil and the world's, ahead of New York and Tokyo. This airport is the home base of the State Civil Police Air Tactical Unit, the State Military Police Radio Patrol Unit and the São Paulo Flying Club.
From this airport, passengers can take advantage of some 350 remote helipads and heliports to bypass heavy road traffic.

Urban rail 

São Paulo has an urban rail transit system (São Paulo Metro and CPTM) that serves 184 stations and has  of track, forming the largest metropolitan rail transport network of Latin America. The underground and urban railway lines together carry some 7 million people on an average weekday. 

The São Paulo Metro operates  of rapid transit system, with six lines in operation, serving 91 stations. In 2015, the metro reached the mark of 11.5 million passengers per mile of line, 15% higher than in 2008, when 10 million users were taken per mile. It is the largest concentration of people in a single transport system in the world, according to the company. The company ViaQuatro, a private concessionaire, operates the Line 4 of the system. In 2014, the São Paulo Metro was elected the best metro system in the Americas. The Line 15 (Silver) of the São Paulo Metro is the first mass-transit monorail of the South America and the first system in the world to use the Bombardier Innovia Monorail 300. When fully completed will be the largest and highest capacity monorail system in the Americas and second worldwide, only behind to the Chongqing Monorail.

The Companhia Paulista de Trens Metropolitanos (CPTM, or "Paulista Company of Metropolitan Trains") railway add  of commuter rail, with seven lines and 94 stations. The system carries about 2.8 million passengers a day. On 8 June 2018, CPTM set a weekday ridership record with 3,096,035 trips. The Line 13 (Jade) of the CPTM connects São Paulo to the São Paulo–Guarulhos International Airport, in the municipality of Guarulhos, the first major international airport in South America to be directly served by train.

CCR Group (through the ViaQuatro and ViaMobilidade concessionaires) operates subway lines 4–Yellow and 5–Lilac, in addition to managing (through the ViaMobilidade concessionaire) lines 8-Diamond and 9-Emerald of the metropolitan train system. Metro and metropolitan train networks transport an average of nearly 7 million people a day, while another 2 million passengers are transported by EMTU buses daily.

The two major São Paulo railway stations are Luz and Júlio Prestes in the Luz/Campos Eliseos region. Julio Prestes Station connected Southwest São Paulo State and Northern Paraná State to São Paulo City. Agricultural products were transferred to Luz Station from which they headed to the Atlantic Ocean and overseas. Júlio Prestes stopped transporting passengers through the Sorocabana or FEPASA lines and now only has metro service. Due to its acoustics and interior beauty, surrounded by Greek revival columns, part of the rebuilt station was transformed into the São Paulo Hall.

Luz Station was built in Britain and assembled in Brazil. It has an underground station and is still active with metro lines that link São Paulo to the Greater São Paulo region to the East and the Campinas Metropolitan region in Jundiaí in the western part of the State. Luz Station is surrounded by important cultural institutions such as the Pinacoteca do Estado, The Museu de Arte Sacra on Tiradentes Avenue and Jardim da Luz, among others. It is the seat of the Santos-Jundiaí line which historically transported international immigrants from the Port of Santos to São Paulo and the coffee plantation lands in the Western region of Campinas. São Paulo has no tram lines, although trams were common in the first half of the 20th century.

Buses 

Bus transport (government and private) is composed of 17,000 buses (including about 290 trolley buses). The traditional system of informal transport (dab vans) was later reorganized and legalized. The trolleybus systems provide a portion of the public transport service in Greater São Paulo with two independent netwoeks. The SPTrans (São Paulo Transportes) system opened in 1949 and serves the city of São Paulo, while the Empresa Metropolitana de Transportes Urbanos de São Paulo (EMTU) system opened in 1988 and serves suburban areas to the southeast of the city proper. Worldwide, São Paulo is one of only two metropolitan areas possessing two independent trolleybus systems, the other being Naples, Italy.

São Paulo Tietê Bus Terminal the second largest bus terminal in the world, after PABT in New York It serves localities across the nation, with the exception of the states of Amazonas, Roraima and Amapá. Routes to 1,010 cities in five countries (Brazil, Argentina, Chile, Uruguay and Paraguay) are available. It connects to all regional airports and a ride sharing automobile service to Santos.

The Palmeiras-Barra Funda Intermodal Terminal is much smaller and is connected to the Palmeiras-Barra Funda metro and Palmeiras-Barra Funda CPTM stations. It serves the southwestern cities of Sorocaba, Itapetininga, Itu, Botucatu, Bauru, Marília, Jaú, Avaré, Piraju, Santa Cruz do Rio Pardo, Ipaussu, Chavantes and Ourinhos (on the border with Paraná State). It also serves São José do Rio Preto, Araçatuba and other small towns on the northwest of São Paulo State.

Culture

Music

Adoniran Barbosa was a samba singer and composer who became successful during São Paulo's early radio era. Born in 1912 in the town of Valinhos, Barbosa was known as the "composer to the masses", particularly Italian immigrants living in the quarters of Bela Vista, also known as "Bexiga" and Brás, as well as those who lived in the city's many 'cortiços' or tenements. His songs drew from the life of urban workers, the unemployed and those who lived on the edge. His first big hit was "Saudosa Maloca" ("Shanty of Fond Memories" – 1951), wherein three homeless friends recall with nostalgia their improvised shanty home, which was torn down by the landowner to make room for a building. His 1964 Trem das Onze ("The 11 pm Train"), became one of the five best samba songs ever, the protagonist explains to his lover that he cannot stay any longer because he has to catch the last train to the Jaçanã suburb, for his mother will not sleep before he arrives home. Another important musician with a similar style is Paulo Vanzolini. Vanzolini is a PhD in biology and a part-time professional musician. He composed a song depicting a love murder scene in São Paulo called "Ronda".

In the late 1960s, a psychedelic rock band called Os Mutantes became popular. Their success is related to that of other tropicalia musicians. The group was known as very paulistanos in its behavior and clothing. Os Mutantes released five albums before lead singer Rita Lee departed in 1972 to join another group called Tutti Frutti. Although initially known only in Brazil, Os Mutantes became successful abroad after the 1990s. In 2000, Tecnicolor, an album recorded in the early 1970s in English by the band, was released with artwork designed by Sean Lennon.

In the early 1980s, a band called Ultraje a Rigor (Elegant Outrage) emerged. They played a simple and irreverent style of rock. The lyrics depicted the changes in society and culture that Brazilian society was experiencing. A late punk and garage scene became strong in the 1980s, perhaps associated with the gloomy scenario of unemployment during an extended recession. Bands originating from this movement include Ira!, Titãs, Ratos de Porão and Inocentes. In the 1990s, drum and bass arose as another musical movement in São Paulo, with artists such as DJ Marky, DJ Patife, XRS, Drumagick and Fernanda Porto. Many heavy metal bands also originated in São Paulo, such as Angra, Project46, Torture Squad, Korzus and Dr. Sin. Famous electro-pop band Cansei de Ser Sexy, or CSS (Portuguese for "tired of being sexy") also has its origins in the city.

Many of the most important classical Brazilian living composers, such as Amaral Vieira, Osvaldo Lacerda and Edson Zampronha, were born and live in São Paulo. Local baritone Paulo Szot has won international acclaim performing for six consecutive seasons at The Metropolitan Opera, La Scala and Opera de Paris, among others; and The Tony Award for best actor in a musical for his performance in a 2008 revival of South Pacific. The São Paulo State Symphony is one of the world's outstanding orchestras; their artistic director beginning in 2012 is the noted American conductor Marin Alsop. In 1952, Heitor Villa-Lobos wrote his Symphony Number 10 ('Ameríndia') for the 400th anniversary of São Paulo: an allegorical, historical and religious account of the city told through the eyes of its founder José de Anchieta.

São Paulo's opera houses are: São Paulo Municipal Theater, Theatro São Pedro and Alfa Theater, for the symphonic concerts there is the Sala São Paulo, the latter being the headquarters of OSESP, an orchestra. The city hosts several music halls. The main ones are: Citibank Hall, HSBC Music Hall, Olympia, Via Funchal, Villa Country, Arena Anhembi and Espaco das Américas. The Anhembi Sambadrome hosts musical presentations as well, in addition to the Carnival of São Paulo. Other facilities include the new Praça das Artes, with the Municipal Conservatory of Music Chamber Hall and others venues, like, Cultura Artistica, Teatro Sérgio Cardoso with a venue for only dance performances and Herzog & DeMeron's Centro Cultural Luz, for Ballet, Opera, theater and concerts, with three huge halls. The auditorium of the Latin-American Cultural Center, The Mozarteum, holds concerts through the year. Festivals as the Virada Cultural (Cultural Overnight) happen once a year and holds hundreds of attractions spread throughout the city.

Literature

São Paulo was home to the first Jesuit missionaries in Brazil, in the early 16th century. They wrote reports to the Portuguese crown about the newly found land, the native peoples and composed poetry and music for the catechism, creating the first written works from the area. The literary priests included Manuel da Nóbrega and José de Anchieta, living in or near the colony then called Piratininga. They also helped to register the Old Tupi language, lexicon and its grammar.
In 1922, the Brazilian Modernist Movement, launched in São Paulo, began to achieve cultural independence. Brazil had gone through the same stages of development as the rest of Latin America, but its political and cultural independence came more gradually.

Brazilian elite culture was originally strongly tied to Portugal. Gradually writers developed a multi-ethnic body of work that was distinctively Brazilian. The presence of large numbers of former slaves added a distinctive African character to the culture. Subsequent infusions of immigrants of non-Portuguese origin broadened the range of influences.

Mário de Andrade and Oswald de Andrade were the prototypical modernists. With the urban poems of "Paulicéia Desvairada" and "Carefree Paulistan land" (1922), Mário de Andrade established the movement in Brazil. His rhapsodic novel Macunaíma (1928), with its abundance of Brazilian folklore, represents the apex of modernism's nationalist prose through its creation of an offbeat native national hero. Oswald de Andrade's experimental poetry, avant-garde prose, particularly the novel Serafim Ponte Grande (1933) and provocative manifestos exemplify the movement's break with tradition.

Modernist artists and writers chose the Municipal Theatre of São Paulo to launch their Modernist manifesto. The site happened to be a bastion of European culture with opera and classical music presentations from Germany, France, Austria and Italy. They defied the high society that frequented the venue and who insisted on speaking only foreign languages such as French, behaving as if Brazilian culture did not matter.

Theaters
Many historians believe that the first theatrical performance in Brazil was held in São Paulo. The Portuguese Jesuit missionary José de Anchieta (1534–1597) wrote short plays that were performed and watched by the Tupi–Guarani natives. In the second half of the 19th century a cultural, musical and theatrical life emerged. European ethnic groups began holding performances in some of the state's rural cities. The most important period for the art in São Paulo was the 1940s. São Paulo had had a professional company, Teatro Brasileiro de Comédia, (Brazilian Theater of Comedy), along with others.

During the 1960s, major theater productions in São Paulo and Brazil were presented by two groups. Teatro de Arena began with a group of students from Escola de Arte Dramática (Drama Art School), founded by Alfredo Mesquita, in 1948. In 1958, the group excelled with the play "Eles não usam black tie" by Gianfrancesco Guarnieri which was the first in the history of the Brazilian drama to feature labor workers as protagonists.

After the military coup of 1964, plays started focusing on Brazilian history (Zumbi, Tiradentes). Teatro de Arena and Teatro Oficina supported the democratic resistance during the military dictatorship period, marked by its censorship. The Tropicalist movement began there. A number of plays represented historic moments, notably "O Rei da Vela", "Galileu Galilei" (1968), "Na Sela das Cidades" (1969) and "Gracias Señor" (1972).

The district of Bixiga concentrates the greatest number of theaters, around 40 including the theaters that are closed for refurbishing or for other reasons, and small alternatives companies venues. Some of the most important are Renault, Brigadeiro, Zaccaro, Bibi Ferreira, Maria della Costa, Ruth Escobar, Opera, TBC, Imprensa, Oficina, Àgora, Cacilda Becker, Sérgio Cardoso, do Bixiga, and Bandeirantes.

Museums

São Paulo has many neighborhoods and buildings of historical value. The city has a large number of museums and art galleries. Among the museums in the city are São Paulo Museum of Art (MASP), the Ipiranga Museum, the Museum of Sacred Art, the Museum of the Portuguese Language, the Pinacoteca do Estado de São Paulo, among other renowned institutions. It also houses one of the top five zoos in the world, the São Paulo Zoo.

The Ipiranga Museum is the first monument built to preserve the memory of the Independence of Brazil, opened on 7 September 1895, with the name of Natural Science Museum]. In 1919, it became a history museum. Reflecting the architectural influence of the Versailles Palace in France, the Ipiranga's collection, with approximately 100,000 pieces, comprises works of art, furniture, clothing and appliances that belonged to those who took part in Brazilian history, such as explorers, rulers and freedom fighters. Its facilities house a library with 100,000 books and the "Centro de Documentação Histórica", Historic Documentation Center, with 40,000 manuscripts.

The Ema Gordon Klabin Cultural Foundation opened to the public in March 2007. Its headquarters is a 1920s mansion. It houses 1545 works, including paintings by Marc Chagall, Pompeo Batoni, Pierre Gobert and Frans Post, Brazilian modernists Tarsila do Amaral, Di Cavalcanti and Portinari, period furniture, decorative and archeological pieces.

It is home to the headquarters of Parlamento Latino-Americano – Parlatino (Latin American Parliament). Designed by Oscar Niemeyer, Memorial has an exhibition pavilion with permanent exhibition of the continent's craftwork production; a library with books, newspapers, magazines, videos, films and records about the history of Latin America; and a 1,679-seat auditorium.

Hospedaria do Imigrante (Immigrant's Hostel) was built in 1886 and opened in 1887. Immigrant's Hostel was built in Brás to welcome the immigrants who arrived in Brazil through the Port of Santos, quarantining those who were sick and helping new arrivals to find work in coffee plantations in Western, Northern and Southwestern São Paulo State and Northern Paraná State. From 1882 to 1978, 2.5 million immigrants of more than 60 nationalities and ethnicities were guests there, all of them duly registered in the museum's books and lists. The hostel hosted approximately 3,000 people on average, but occasionally reached 8,000. The hostel received the last immigrants in 1978.

In 1998 the hostel became a museum, where it preserves the immigrants' documentation, memory and objects. Located in one of the few remaining centenarian buildings, the museum occupies part of the former hostel. The museum also restores wooden train wagons from the former São Paulo Railway. Two restored wagons inhabit the museum. One dates from 1914, while a second class passenger car dates from 1931. The museum records the names of all immigrants who were hosted there from 1888 to 1978.

MASP has one of world's most important collections of European art. The most important collections cover Italian and French painting schools. The museum was founded by Assis Chateaubriand and is directed by Pietro Maria Bardi. Its headquarters, opened in 1968, were designed by Lina Bo Bardi. MASP organizes temporary exhibitions in special areas. Brazilian and international exhibitions of contemporary arts, photography, design and architecture take turn during the whole year.

Located next to the Luz metro station, the Pinacoteca do Estado de São Paulo was projected by architect Ramos de Azevedo in 1895. It was constructed to house an Arts Lyceum. In 1911, it became a museum, where it hosts a number of art exhibitions, such as bronze statues of French sculptor Auguste Rodin took place in 2001. There is also a permanent exhibition on the "Resistance" movement that took place during military dictatorship in the Republican period, including a reconstructed prison cell where political prisoners were kept.

The Oca (oca means thatched house in Native Brazilian Tupi-Guarani) is a white, spaceship-like building sitting in the greens of Ibirapuera Park. Modern art, Native Brazilian art, and photographie are some of the topics of past thematic exhibitions.

Museu da Imagem e do Som (Image and Sound Museum) preserves music, cinema, photography and graphical arts. MIS has a collection of more than 200,000 images. It has more than 1,600 fiction videotapes, documentaries and music and 12,750 titles recorded in Super 8 and 16 mm film. MIS organizes concerts, cinema and video festivals and photography and graphical arts exhibitions.

The Museum of Art of the Parliament of São Paulo is a contemporary art museum housed in the Palácio 9 de Julho, the Legislative Assembly of São Paulo house. The museum is run by the Department of Artistic Heritage of the Legislative Assembly and has paintings, sculpture, prints, ceramics and photographs, exploring the Brazilian contemporary art.

The Museu do Futebol (Football Museum) is at the famous soccer stadium Paulo Machado de Carvalho, which was built in 1940 during Getúlio Vargas presidency. The museum shows the history of soccer with a special attention to the memories, emotions and cultural values promoted by the sport during the 20th and 21st centuries in Brazil. The visit also includes fun and interactive activities, 16 rooms from the permanent collection, plus a temporary exposition.

Media

São Paulo is home to the two most important daily newspapers in Brazil, Folha de S.Paulo and O Estado de S. Paulo. Also, the top three weekly news magazines of the country are based in the city, Veja, Época and ISTOÉ.

Two of the five major television networks are based in the city, Band and RecordTV, while SBT and RedeTV! are based in Osasco, a city in the São Paulo metropolitan area, while Globo, the country's most watched TV channel, has a major news bureau and entertainment production center in the city. In addition, Gazeta is at Paulista Avenue and the city is used for its station idents since 2014.

Many of the major AM and FM radio networks of Brazil are headquartered in São Paulo, such as Jovem Pan, Rádio Mix, Transamérica, BandNews FM, CBN, 89 A Radio Rock, Kiss FM and Band FM. The telephone area code for the city of São Paulo is 11.

Sports

The city hosts sporting events of national and international importance, such as the São Paulo Grand Prix, held at the Interlagos Circuit. Among the main events that São Paulo hosted are the 1950 FIFA World Cup, the 1963 Pan American Games, the 2000 FIFA Club World Championship, the 2014 FIFA World Cup Opening Ceremony (and five more matches from the same tournament) and The city also has a Jockey Club, where the first race took place on 29 October 1876.

As in the rest of Brazil, football is the most popular sport. The city's major teams are Corinthians, Palmeiras and São Paulo. Portuguesa is a medium club and Juventus, Nacional and Barcelona EC are three small clubs.

Formula One is also one of the most popular sports in Brazil. One of Brazil's most famous sportsmen is three-time Formula One world champion and São Paulo native Ayrton Senna. The Formula One São Paulo Grand Prix (formally known as the Brazilian Grand Prix) is held at the Autódromo José Carlos Pace in Interlagos, Socorro. The Grand Prix has been held at the Interlagos circuit from 1973 to 1977, in 1979 and 1980, and from 1990 to the present. Four Brazilian drivers have won the Brazilian Grand Prix, all of whom were born in São Paulo: Emerson Fittipaldi (1973 and 1974), José Carlos Pace (1975), Ayrton Senna (1991 and 1993) and Felipe Massa (2006 and 2008). In 2007, a new local railway station Autódromo of the Line C (Line 9) of CPTM, was constructed near the circuit to improve access.

Volleyball, basketball, skateboard and tennis are other major sports. There are several traditional sports clubs in São Paulo that are home for teams in many championships. The most important are Esporte Clube Pinheiros (waterpolo, women's volleyball, swimming, men's basketball and handball), Clube Athletico Paulistano (basketball), Esporte Clube Banespa (volleyball, handball and futsal), Esporte Clube Sírio (basketball), Associação Atlética Hebraica (basketball), Clube Atlético Monte Líbano (basketball), Clube de Campo Associação Atlética Guapira (amateur football) and Clube Atlético Ipiranga (multi-sports and former professional football).

The São Silvestre Race takes place every New Year's Eve. The São Paulo Indy 300 was an IndyCar Series race in Santana that ran annually from 2010 to 2013. The event was removed from the 2014 season calendar. São Paulo hosted the official 1984 Tournament of the Americas (basketball) where the Brazilian national team won its first out of four gold medals.

In Bom Retiro district, there is a public baseball stadium, Estádio Mie Nishi, while Santo Amaro district is the seat of the Núcleo de Alto Rendimento (NAR) is a high performance sports center focused on Olympic athletes. São Paulo is also rugby union's stronghold in Brazil, with the main rugby field in the city being at the São Paulo Athletic Club, São Paulo's oldest club, founded by the British community. The Cobras Brasil XV, Brazilian professional franchise that plays the Super Rugby Americas, is based in São Paulo. 

The city has five major stadiums: Morumbi Stadium, owned by São Paulo FC; Pacaembu Stadium, owned by the municipal administration; the Allianz Parque arena by S.E. Palmeiras; Canindé Stadium, owned by Portuguesa de Desportos and Arena Corinthians, owned by Sport Club Corinthians Paulista, located in Itaquera. It also has several volleyball and basketball gyms, tennis courts, and many other sports arenas, such as the Ginásio do Ibirapuera, intended mainly for athletics.

Notable people

See also

 ABCD Region
 Japanese cuisine in São Paulo
 Large Cities Climate Leadership Group
 Largest cities in the Americas
 List of municipalities in the state of São Paulo by population
 OPENCities
 Caminhada Noturna (night walk)
 Rio de Janeiro

References

Bibliography

Notes

External links

Official websites
 São Paulo City Hall website 
 São Paulo Tourism Office website
 São Paulo Metro (subway) website
 BM&F Bovespa – São Paulo Stock Exchange website

Other websites
 São Paulo in The New York Times Travel Guide s
 UK House of Commons Trade and Industry Committee report on Brazil
 
 
 Maplink – São Paulo Street Guide and Maps 
 OPENCities Monitor participant
 Discovering São Paulo
 Travel Guide to Brazil
 AboutBrasil/São Paulo – Powerhouse of South America

News stories
 AdBusters, "São Paulo: A City Without Ads".
 The Times, "Cutting-edge style in São Paulo", by Alex Bello.
 The Times, "Where cafezinho is the key to commerce". Retrieved 6 December 2007.
 Guardian Unlimited, "Blog by blog guide to ... São Paulo".
 The New York Times, "36 Hours in São Paulo".
 Rich Brazilians Rise Above Rush-Hour Jams.

 
Populated places established in 1554
1554 establishments in the Portuguese Empire